The Trinidad and Tobago men's national tennis team represents Trinidad and Tobago in Davis Cup tennis competition and are governed by Tennis TT.

Trinidad and Tobago have appeared in Group II on three occasions, but have yet to win a match at that level. They have not competed since 2016.

History
Trinidad and Tobago competed in its first Davis Cup in 1990.

Current team (2022) 

 Nabeel Majeed Mohammed
 Ebolum Pastor Nwokolo
 Joseph Cadogan
 Akiel Duke
 Luca Shamsi (Junior player)

See also
Davis Cup
Trinidad and Tobago Fed Cup team

References

External links

Davis Cup teams
Davis Cup
Davis Cup